Town Bus is a 1955 Indian Tamil-language romantic comedy film directed by K. Somu and produced by M. A. Venu. The film was written by A. P. Nagarajan, and the soundtrack was composed by K. V. Mahadevan. The film stars N. N. Kannappa and Anjali Devi, with V. K. Ramasamy, A. Karunanidhi, T. K. Ramachandran, M. N. Rajam and T. P. Muthulakshmi in supporting roles. The plot of the film was built around a bus transport company based in Coimbatore. The film, released on 13 November 1955, performed well at the box office.

Plot 
Velu, an unemployed youth, meets a bus conductor Amutha by circumstance, joins the transporter company as driver and gradually gets close to her. The owner's daughter falls in love with him, but her father wants her to marry Ramu, a relative who is the manager of the company. He is only after money and also a womaniser.

Velu's friend Mannaru falls in love with another conductor Poongavam. The manager dismisses the two drivers, after which Velu becomes an auto rickshaw driver. Soon he sets up his own company and experiences success in a short span of time. He marries Amutha and has a child through her. As he becomes more successful, his lifestyle changes and he falls in love with another woman, a dancer Pankajam.

Amutha learns about her husband's affair with Pankajam and more complications follow. She eventually learns that Pankajam is her long-lost sister. Ramu locks up Velu in a room with the intention of killing him. The two women and the bus owner's daughter, who remains single, team up to save Velu. In the process, Ramu shoots Pankajam and is arrested. Velu, Amutha and their child unite and live happily.

Cast 

Male cast
 N. N. Kannappa as Velu
 V. K. Ramasamy as Ayya Kannu
 A. Karunanidhi as Mannaru
 T. K. Ramachandran as Ramu
 P. D. Sambandam as Vaiyapuri
 P. S. Venkatachalam as Thayanidhipillai
 Kallapart Natarajan as Satagopan
 R. Pakkirisamy as Murugan

Female cast
 Anjali Devi as Amutha
 M. N. Rajam as Pankajam
 T. P. Muthulakshmi as Poongavanam
 K. S. Angamuthu as Meenakshi
 Tambaram Lalitha as Vimala
 Baby Kanchana as Mani

Production 
Town Bus was directed by K. Somu and produced by M. A. Venu for M. A. V. Pictures. The film was written by A. P. Nagarajan. V. K. Gopal was the cinematographer. Shooting took place mainly in Coimbatore.

Soundtrack 
The music was composed by K. V. Mahadevan, with lyrics by Ka. Mu. Sheriff. Songs such as "Chittukkuruvi Chittukuruvi" (picturised on Anjali Devi) and the dance number "Leda Lady Aruginil Vaada Aadi Paadalam" became popular.

Release and reception 
Town Bus was released on 13 November 1955. The Indian Express wrote, "Anjali Devi appears to game for any kind of role and she makes a truly striking figure as a bus conductress". According to historian Randor Guy, the film was commercially successful mainly because of the music.

References

External links 
 

1950s road comedy-drama films
1950s romantic comedy-drama films
1950s Tamil-language films
1955 films
Films about buses
Films about women in India
Films directed by K. Somu
Films scored by K. V. Mahadevan
Films set in 1955
Films shot in Coimbatore
Films with screenplays by A. P. Nagarajan
Indian black-and-white films
Indian road comedy-drama films
Indian romantic comedy-drama films